The ensemble Alash is a throat singing band from Tuva, Russia, that performs traditional Tuvan music with some non-traditional influences.

History
The musicians of Alash are Bady-Dorzhu Ondar, Ayan-ool Sam, and Ayan Shirizhik. All were trained in traditional Tuvan music since childhood, first learning from their families and later becoming students of master throat singers.

Originally called Changy-Xaya, the group was formed at Kyzyl Arts College in 1999 and quickly became the resident traditional ensemble.  At the same time, the young musicians were learning harmony, theory, staff notation and western classical music.  They began to incorporate non-traditional elements and instruments that mesh well with the sound and feel of traditional Tuvan music. They use old instruments such as the murgu, limpi, and shoor (wind instruments) that are not frequently played in Tuva today, as well as distinctly western instruments such as the guitar and accordion.

The outgrowth of this musical exploration is the ensemble Alash, which is named for the Alash River that flows through the musicians' home region of Tuva.  Kongar-ool Ondar was the first artistic director, and he played a key role in the development of the ensemble.  Since its inception, Alash has undergone several personnel changes.  Former members include Sergei Sotpa, Mai-ool Sedip and Nachyn Choodu.

In 2004, Alash won first prize at the International Xöömei (throat singing) Symposium competition.  In 2005, ensemble member Bady-Dorzhu Ondar was named the best male singer at the Üstüü-Xüree festival, and in 2006 he was named People's Xöömeizhi (throat singer) of the Republic of Tuva, the youngest person ever to receive this prestigious award. At the 2008 International Xöömei Symposium, Bady-Dorzhu Ondar won the grand prize, while Ayan-ool Sam and Ayan Shirizhik won first and second prizes for individual throat singing. In 2009, Ayan Shirizhik was awarded the title "Distinguished Artist of Tuva."

Alash toured the United States in 2006 at the invitation of the Open World Leadership Center at the Library of Congress with funding from the National Endowment for the Arts.  Their trip was organized by CEC ArtsLink, an organization that orchestrates cross-cultural arts exchanges and grants between the US and Central Europe, Russia, and Eurasia.

Alash has toured the United States every year since, playing at a variety of venues.  They also conduct workshops at schools and colleges to share their music and culture with American young people. In December 2008, December 2009 and December 2010, Alash toured with the American group Béla Fleck and the Flecktones to promote the Flecktones' Grammy winning album Jingle All the Way, which features Alash as guest artists.  While touring with the Flecktones, Alash also had the opportunity to perform their traditional Tuvan music.

In August 2007, the group performed for President Vladimir Putin while he was on holiday in Tuva.

Sean Quirk, an American scholar and musician who resides in Tuva, is the group's manager, producer, and interpreter.  In 2008, Quirk was named Merited Artist of Tuva for his promotion of traditional Tuvan music and culture both inside Tuva and abroad.  Quirk and the other members of Alash are also members of the Tuvan National Orchestra.

Recordings
Alash Live at the Enchanted Garden March 2006
Alash April 2007
Jingle All the Way September 2008. Guest artists on the grammy-winning CD by the Flecktones
Buura May 2011
Achai Spring 2015
Meni Mana Fall 2020 (digital only)

External links 

 
Washington Post concert review. June 21, 2007 - scroll down to Alash
Open World Program Offers Rare Glimpse of Unique Musical Art February 1, 2006
Hearts In Their Throats, Newsweek, March 17, 2006
Bady-Dorzhu Ondar and Maya Akhpasheva are Best Singers at the Ustuu Khuree Festival, Tuva Online, July 9, 2005
Who Are This Year's Khoomei Champions in Tuva? Tuva Online, July 29, 2004

Russian folk music groups
Musical groups established in 1999
Musical groups from Tuva
Culture in Kyzyl
Throat singing
1999 establishments in Russia